Arab Handball Championship of Champions Club is an international club handball competition organized by the Arab Handball Federation for champions of the Arab World countries.

Results

 A round-robin tournament determined the final standings.
 No third place match played.

Winners by club

Winners by country

See also
 Arab Handball Championship of Winners' Cup
 Arab Handball Super Cup
 Arab Women's Handball Championship of Champions
 Arab Women's Handball Championship of Winners' Cup
 Arab Women's Handball Super Cup

External links 
 The last competitions - goalzz.com
 

 
Handball in the Arab world